Agustín Palavecino (born 9 November 1996) is an Argentine professional footballer who plays as an attacking midfielder for River Plate.

Club career

Early career and Platense
Born in Florida in the outskirts of Buenos Aires, Palavecino started playing in the indoor football section of Platense at the age of 4, and three years later he moved into the association football section of the aforementioned club, playing for the youth setup until his promotion to the senior team in 2015. He had his senior team debut on 11 March 2015, in a 0–0 draw with Barracas Central, and scored his first goal in a 2–1 win against Comunicaciones on 10 May 2015. Palavecino was instrumental in the club's promotion to Primera B Nacional by winning the 2017–18 Primera B Metropolitana championship.

Deportivo Cali
On 8 February 2019, Platense announced the transfer of Palavecino to Colombian club Deportivo Cali. He played his first match with the team on 24 February, entering as a substitute in the second half of Deportivo Cali's match against Independiente Medellín, which ended in a 1–1 draw.

River Plate
On 12 February 2021, Palavecino joined River Plate.

Personal life
Palavecino is the cousin of Sevilla FC footballer Erik Lamela.

Honors
Platense
 Primera B: 2017–18

Deportivo Cali
 Copa Colombia Runners-up: 2019

References

External links
 

1996 births
Living people
People from Vicente López Partido
Sportspeople from Buenos Aires Province
Argentine people of Italian descent
Argentine footballers
Association football midfielders
Club Atlético Platense footballers
Deportivo Cali footballers
Club Atlético River Plate footballers
Primera Nacional players
Primera B Metropolitana players
Categoría Primera A players
Argentine expatriate footballers
Expatriate footballers in Colombia
Argentine expatriate sportspeople in Colombia